Vidurashwatha is a village located in the Gauribidanur taluk of Chikkaballapur district in the state of Karnataka, India. Situated near the Karnataka–Andhra Pradesh border and about 6 km from Gauribidanur, it played a significant role in the Indian independence movement.

Etymology 
The name Vidurashwatha is derived from that of a big Ashwatha (sacred fig) tree located in this village. According to a legend of the times of Mahabharata, this tree was planted by Vidura, a courtier in the kingdom of Dhritarashtra; and hence the name Vidurashwatha. In 2001, this ancient tree fell to the ground.

History
Vidurashwatha is known as the Jalianwalabagh of southern India. Around 35 freedom fighters martyred while hoisting the flag of the Indian National Congress flag here. Veera Saudha is built on the memory of this freedom movement.

References

Villages in Chikkaballapur district
Indian independence movement